Big Brother 2023 is the third cooperation season of the Dutch and Belgian version of Big Brother. It is the ninth regular version of Big Brother in both Belgium and the Netherlands. The show is broadcast on RTL5 in the Netherlands and Play4 in Belgium beginning on 9 January 2023. Live streams are available 24/7 on Videoland for Dutch viewers and on GoPlay.be and Telenet for Belgian viewers.

In August 2022, there was an announcement of the new season and a call for new housemates. The start and house of the season was revealed at the beginning of January 2023.

Geraldine Kemper returned as host of the show. Tatyana Beloy was announced as the new Belgian host. 

The house of the previous seasons remained but was again restyled. It was intended to be very colorful. The shop of the previous season was changed into the Wall. A safe was also added. In the bathroom the bath was removed and replaced by a make-up table. A secret room and outside game area was added. Next to the house a showbuilding was built.  The format of the show was also retooled adding the Power of Nomination, Big Brother coins and a jackpot of 100.000 euro at the start. 

The eleven first housemates arrived at January 2023.  The first episode aired on 9 January 2023. Loneliner Jason Glas became very popular. The public arranged a plane with message that flew by. Because the housemates had to play much more individual, there were more tensions and fights. The livestream was even stopped one time. Rob Groenendijk had all the bad luck. The senior of the group of housemates had lots of ailments and was most of the times at the couch. He was visited by a doctor three times, a record. In week 7 he asked to be nominated, but his will was not granted. Because of that Groenendijk decided to leave the house himself. For the first time ever in this cooperation edition an evicted housemate, Danny Volkers,  returned to the house after some time as actual housemate, back competing in the game.

Production

Format 
Big Brother 2023 followed the same format as the previous seasons of the program. Housemates lived in isolation from the outside world in a custom-built house for a period of 100 days, hoping to be the last one to leave the house as the winner, and walk away with a large cash prize.

Concept
Producers of the reality show stated this season would be different compared to the other seasons. This was explained during the launch.  This season the housemates had to play indivually. This was enhanced by introductions of the following new things:
- Big Brother coins: each housemate had his own budget of Big Brother coins. Housemates could earn coins by doing tasks and could spend the coins in the Wall.
- Power of Nomination: only the winner of the Power of Nomination game would be able to nominate. 

The secret room was also added. One housemate a week could gain access to that room by winning the Time Game. That housemate was helped in that room by the Live viewers. By doing the task in the secret room, the housemates were ranked. At the end there would be a reward for the best player.

Broadcasts 
The first episode was pre-recorded on the evening of 6 January 2023 and simultaneously broadcast on RTL4 and RTL5 in the Netherlands, Play4 on Belgium on 9 January 2023. The Daily show aired from Monday to Friday with the live show on Saturday night.

Housemates

Eleven housemates entered the house during the launch. The following weeks five housemates were added.

Twists

Prize money 
In this season, the prize money started at €100.000. The prize money would decrease by housemates buying personal items or favors. The prize money could also increase by winning missions.

Big Brother coins
In this season, housemates could earn and spend Big Brother coins. They could earn them by succeeding in tasks and spend them in the newly shopping room, the Wall. Each housemate had his wallet of coins.

 Housemates from The Netherlands
 Housemates from Belgium

Secret room challenge 
In this season, a secret room was added. Each week one housemate could gain access to the room. That housemate had to choose an object which would lead to that housemates mission. Housemates gained points for the secret room challenge.

Weekly summary 
The main events in the Big Brother house are summarised in the table below.

Episodes
<onlyinclude>

Nominations table

 Housemates from The Netherlands
 Housemates from Belgium

Notes
: Because Judy chose the suitcase with nomination in Jason's game, she already faced eviction.
: Because of winning a battle, Team Pink won the Power of Nomination.
: Jason had the most nominations and had to leave the house immediately. Unknown to the other housemates, he went to the secret control room.
: Because of failed secret missions, Jason stayed nominated.
: Rob had the most nominations during the dilemma nominations and was nominated automatically.
: Since Charlotte had the fewest votes to save, she was automatically nominated the next week.
: Since Charlotte and Lindsey won the talent weeks, they were rewarded. Lindsey won immunity and Charlotte lost her nomination (indicated by )
: Since Lindsey chose the secret box during the jackpot challenge with hourglass, she could nominate one housemate.

References

External links
 
 
 Dutch official website on RTL
 Belgian official website on Play4

08
Big Brother (franchise)
2020s Belgian television series
2020s Dutch television series
Belgian reality television series
Dutch reality television series
Dutch-language television shows